"Aurinko ei nouse" is first single produced by the Finnish industrial metal band Ruoska and was released in 2002.  It is from their first album, Kuori.

Track listings
 "Aurinko ei nouse"
 "Kiroan"

References

External links
 Additional information (in Finnish)
 "Aurinko ei nouse" lyrics

Ruoska songs
2002 singles
2002 songs
Song articles with missing songwriters